The Turmbergbahn is a funicular railway in Karlsruhe in Germany. It is the oldest operating funicular in Germany. From  Karlsruhe's former center Durlach, the line climbs the Turmberg, which on a clear day provides a lookout point with views of the Rhine Valley, the Palatinate forest and the adjacent parts of Alsace.

The line first opened in 1888 by the Turmbergbahn Durlach AG, and its original form used the water ballast system of propulsion, similar to that still used by the Nerobergbahn in Wiesbaden. Operation of the funicular was interrupted twice during World War II, once near the beginning, and again from 1945 to 1946. The line was comprehensively rebuilt in 1966, and the water ballast drive was replaced by a conventional electric drive. In 2019 it was decided to extend the tracks of the funicular railway to the foot of the hill bringing it closer to the terminal station of the tram in Durlach. It is now run by the Verkehrsbetriebe Karlsruhe, the operator of Karlsruhe's trams.

The funicular has the following technical parameters:

Length: 
Height: 
Maximum steepness: 36.2 %
Configuration: single track with passing loop
Journey time: 3 minutes
Cars: 2
Capacity: 52 passengers per car
Track gauge: 
Traction: Electricity

See also 
 List of funicular railways

References

External links 

Page on the Turmbergbahn from its operator (in German)
Article on the Turmbergbahn from funiculars.net (in English)

Former water-powered funicular railways converted to electricity
Funicular railways in Germany
Rail transport in Karlsruhe
Metre gauge railways in Germany
Railway lines opened in 1888
1888 establishments in Germany